Sayri Túpac (c. 1535–1561) was an Inca ruler in Peru. He was a son of siblings Manco Inca Yupanqui and Cura Ocllo. After the death of his mother in 1539 and of his father in 1544, both at the hands of Spanish conquerors, he became the ruler of the Neo-Inca State in Vilcabamba. He ruled until 1560.

Life
Sayri Tupac's father Manco, the last ruling Inca emperor, had attempted to reach an accommodation with the Spanish conquistadors. He was crowned emperor in 1534 by Francisco Pizarro. However, his cooperation was severely tested by mistreatment at the hands of Francisco's brothers Gonzalo, Juan and Hernando, whom Francisco had temporarily left in charge in Cuzco. Manco escaped from the city in April 1536 and raised a large army of Inca warriors. For ten months he besieged Cuzco but failed to take the city.

After the defeat of Diego de Almagro II El Mozo in the Battle of Chupas (1542) against the army of the Spanish viceroy, some of Almagro's supporters took refuge at Manco's residence in Vilcabamba. Two years later they killed Manco, in front of Sayri Túpac's brother Titu Cusi.

Sayri Túpac was nine years old at the time. He became Inca in Vilcabamba, reigning for ten years with the aid of regents. This was a time of peace with the Spanish. Viceroy Pedro de la Gasca offered to provide Sayri Túpac with lands and houses in Cuzco if he would emerge from the isolated Vilcabamba. Sayri Túpac accepted, but during the preparations his relative Paullu Inca suddenly died. This was taken as a bad omen (or a sign of Spanish treachery), and Sayri Tupac remained in Vilcabamba.

In 1556 a new Spanish viceroy, Andrés Hurtado de Mendoza, 3rd Marquis of Cañete, arrived in the colony. Although the Inca in Vilcabamba was no longer ruler of an Indigenous empire, he was still ruler of an independent native state. Like Viceroy Gasca before him, Hurtado believed it would be safer for the Spanish if Sayri Tupac could be enticed to live in the area of Spanish settlement, where the conquistadors could control him.

The negotiations took time, but Sayri Túpac did agree to leave Vilcabamba. He traveled in a rich litter with 300 attendants. On January 5, 1558, he was received amicably by Viceroy Hurtado in Lima. Sayri Túpac renounced his claim to the Inca Empire and accepted baptism, as Diego. In return he received a full pardon, the title of Prince of Yucay, and great estates with rich revenues. He became resident in Yucay, a day's journey northeast of Cuzco. Significantly, he left behind the Mascaipacha, a crown with red fringe, which was the symbol of his authority as Sapa Inca over the Incan Empire. In Cuzco, he married his sister Cusi Huarcay after receiving a special dispensation from Pope Julius III. They had a daughter. Sayri Túpac never returned to Vilcabamba.

He died suddenly in 1561. His half-brother Titu Cusi Yupanqui took control of Vilcabamba and the Inca resistance to the Spanish. Titu Cusi suspected that Sayri Túpac had been poisoned by the Spanish.

Gallery

See also 

 Túpac Amaru

References

Biographical information
From Incas and Conquistadors
Some information in this article on Túpac Amaru

1530s births
1561 deaths
Inca emperors
16th-century monarchs in South America